Horseshoe Island is one of the South Wellesley Islands, on the Queensland side of the Gulf of Carpentaria, northern Australia.

References

Islands of Queensland
Gulf of Carpentaria